Joseph Howard (September 9, 1878 – May 24, 1908) was an American golfer. He competed in the men's individual event at the 1904 Summer Olympics. He died in May 1908, after being hit by lightning while playing golf.

References

External links
 

1878 births
1908 deaths
American male golfers
Amateur golfers
Olympic golfers of the United States
Golfers at the 1904 Summer Olympics
Sportspeople from Missouri
Deaths from lightning strikes